The 1904–05 season was the first season of organized football in Turkey.

The Istanbul Football League featured only four clubs at the time: Moda FC, HMS Imogene FC, Elpis FC, and Cadi-Keuy FC. The first champions of league football in Turkey was Imogene, a team made up of Englishmen.

The first league of Turkey lasted for 55 years until it was replaced with the Turkish First Football League (now Süper Lig).

References

 
Seasons in Turkish football